Mabini, officially the Municipality of Mabini, is a 2nd class municipality in the province of Davao de Oro, Philippines. According to the 2020 census, it had a population of 43,552.

The municipality is the location of the Mabini Protected Landscape and Seascape. It was formerly known as Cuambog and Doña Alicia.

History
The first people to occupy the area now known as Mabini were the Mansakas.

The settlement was formerly known as Cuambog, named after a tree species of the family Dilleniaceae.

On May 28, 1953, by virtue of Executive Order No. 596 of President Elpidio Quirino, the municipality was created from the eastern part of Tagum and the northern part of Pantukan. Barrio Cuambog became the seat of the municipal government. The municipality was named Doña Alicia after President Quirino's wife Alicia Syquia, who was killed by Japanese soldiers during the Second World War. In 1954, the municipality was renamed in honor of revolutionary leader Apolinario Mabini.

In 1967, the municipality of Maco was created from the northern barangays of Mabini.

Mabini was originally part of Davao province. It became part of Davao del Norte when Davao province was split in 1967. In 1998, Mabini became part of Compostela Valley, a new province which was created from Davao del Norte.

Geography

Climate

Barangays
Mabini is politically subdivided into 11 barangays. In 1957, the sitios of Panibasan Proper and Andili became barrio Panibasan (Pindasan), the sitios of Cadunan Proper, Anislagan, Malabatuan and Lapinigan became barrio Cadunan, and the sitios of Tangnanan Proper, Mampising and Tagbalabao became barrio Tangnanan.

 Cadunan
 Pindasan
 Cuambog (Poblacion)
 Tagnanan (Mampising)
 Anitapan
 Cabuyuan
 Del Pilar
 Libodon
 Golden Valley (Maraut)
 Pangibiran
 San Antonio

Demographics

Economy

See also
List of renamed cities and municipalities in the Philippines

References

External links
   Mabini Profile at the DTI Cities and Municipalities Competitive Index
 [ Philippine Standard Geographic Code]
Philippine Census Information

Municipalities of Davao de Oro
Establishments by Philippine executive order